The 1984–85 Vancouver Canucks season was the team's 15th in the National Hockey League (NHL).

Offseason

On May 18th, Bill LaForge was announced as the new head coach. At 32 years of age, LaForge would be the youngest coach in the NHL at the time. LaForge signed a two-year contract and promised tough practices, while emphasizing his Ph.D philosophy - pride, hustle, and desire.

Having played the majority of the previous season with the team's minor-league affiliate, centre Gerry Minor was not offered a new contract. On May 30th, the team announced it had signed its first Finnish player, Petri Skriko. The 8th round selection in the 1981 Draft had most recently been a member of SaiPa in the Finnish Elite League. After three seasons with the club, Lars Molin turned down a two-way contract and returned to his native Sweden to play with his former club, MoDo AIK.

In the Entry Draft, the Canucks took 5'11" defenceman J. J. Daigneault with the tenth overall pick. He would have a solid rookie campaign, playing 67 games and collecting 27 points.

On June 22nd, the club announced that veteran forward Al MacAdam had been acquired from the North Stars for future considerations. The following day, it was revealed that fan favourite Harold Snepsts would be heading to Minnesota after playing his entire ten-year career in a Canucks uniform.

After neck problems had plagued him during the previous season, Darcy Rota underwent spinal fusion surgery on June 29th.

Entering the option year of his contract and unable to agree to terms for a new one, enforcer Tiger Williams was dealt to the Detroit Red Wings for Rob McClanahan.

Training camp 
The Canucks held their training camp at the Cowichan Community Centre in Duncan, from September 18–21.

49 players took part in the training camp. Notable absences included Thomas Gradin and Patrik Sundström, who were representing Team Sweden in the Canada Cup tournament, as well as Darcy Rota and Stu Kulak who were both recovering from injuries.

Players were divided into three scrimmage teams, around which the training camp revolved. Aligning closely to coach LaForge's pride, hustle, and desire philosophy, the teams were named accordingly: Team Pride (captained by Ron Delorme); Team Hustle (captained by Doug Halward); Team Desire (captained by Stan Smyl). These scrimmage teams competed in a round-robin tournament, with the winning team claiming the Ph.D (Pride, Hustle, Desire) Cup. At the conclusion of each game, all players of the losing team were made to run a mile in full hockey gear. Those with bad knees were permitted to pedal five miles on a stationary bike in full hockey gear.

Regular season
The team continued to travel aboard their private jet, Air Canuck, for all road trips until late in the season when the plane was sold.

Final standings

Schedule and results

Pre-season
The Canucks released their pre-season schedule on June 20, 1984.

Regular season
The Canucks released their regular season schedule on June 27, 1984.

Playoffs
The Canucks did not qualify the playoffs for the first time since the 1977–78 season.

Player statistics

Awards and records

Transactions

Draft picks
Vancouver's draft picks at the 1984 NHL Entry Draft held at the Montreal Forum in Montreal, Quebec.

Farm teams

Fredericton Express (AHL)

See also
1984–85 NHL season

References

External links

Vancouver Canucks seasons
Vancouver C
Vancouver
Vancouver Canucks
Vancouver Canucks